Khatodra is a small village in Mahendragarh District in Haryana, India. It is located 5 km away in south of the city on State Highway 24. It is located in lap of nature.

History 

This village is much older than English times. It was established by sub caste called Bohras Khatodiya Gotr . Khatod is ancestral place of Gomi's (a surname of Yadav's).

Villages in Mahendragarh district

the first sarpanch of this village is lambardar Sh. RamjiLal S/O Sh. kisansahay s/o puran Singh S/O Dalla Ram S/O Ganga Ram S/O JaiRam S/O Govind Ram S/O Khokhar S/O Haiwa Ram JI